New Creation may refer to:

 New Creation Church, a non-denominational megachurch
 The New Creation, a Christian magazine
 New creation (theology), the Christian doctrine of the New Creation, see salvation